Acritus acaroides is a species of clown beetle in the family Histeridae and tribe Acritini. It ranges in size from 0.9-1.1mm, very rarely reaching 2mm. It is found in North America, roughly from eastern Texas to South Carolina.

References

Further reading

 

Histeridae
Articles created by Qbugbot
Beetles described in 1856